Man's Castle is a 1933 pre-Code American film directed by Frank Borzage and starring Spencer Tracy and Loretta Young.

Plot
Well-dressed Bill (Spencer Tracy) takes pity on Trina (Loretta Young), a hungry young woman he meets in a city park and treats her to a dinner in a fancy restaurant. After she is finished, he informs the manager he has no money. He then raises such a ruckus that the manager is all too willing to let them go. When Bill learns that Trina is also homeless, he lets her stay at his ramshackle home in a shanty town. Among their neighbors and friends are widowed former preacher Ira (Walter Connolly) and Flossie (Marjorie Rambeau), an alcoholic older woman Ira is trying to reform.

Bill is a wandering sort, unwilling to live in the same place too long. Trina falls in love with him, but wisely makes no demands that will make him feel trapped in their developing relationship. When she longs for a new stove, he raises the down payment by serving a summons on Fay La Rue (Glenda Farrell), the star of a show. Far from resenting it, Fay wants him for a playmate. He is tempted, but turns her down. Just as Bill's restless nature starts becoming too much for him, Trina tells him she is pregnant. Ira presides at Bill and Trina's wedding.

Before hitting the road by himself, Bill decides to get enough money to support his wife and future child. He agrees to help slimy neighbor Bragg (Arthur Hohl) rob the payroll from a toy factory where Bragg used to work. Ira, the night watchman, shoots Bill before recognizing him, but it is only a flesh wound. Wanting Trina for himself, Bragg turns on the burglar alarm, but Bill gets away with Ira's help. Back home, Trina dresses the wound. Flossie suggests that Bill take Trina away with him, solving Bill's dilemma. After they leave, Bragg threatens to set the police on their track, but Flossie silences him with Ira's gun.

Cast

 Spencer Tracy as Bill 
 Loretta Young as Trina
 Marjorie Rambeau as Flossie 
 Glenda Farrell as Fay La Rue
 Walter Connolly as Ira
 Arthur Hohl as Bragg
 Dickie Moore as Joie

Production

1938 reissue
Columbia re-released the film in 1938, to take advantage of Tracy's much greater popularity. However, with the Production Code in full force, the Hays Office mandated nine minutes of cuts to win a seal of approval. This resulted in a number of blatantly obvious jump cuts where racy dialogue has been removed, as well as the deletion of a shot of a nude Young (or more likely a stunt double) diving into the river. This 66-minute version has been at least partially restored. Turner Classic Movies has a 75-minute version,

Reception
Mordaunt Hall wrote in The New York Times, "Even though Frank Borzage in his direction of Man's Castle, ... gives an occasional fleeting reminder of his successful silent film, Seventh Heaven the story is by no means as plausible or as poetic as that memorable old work. ... Man's Castle can, however, boast of the thoroughly efficient portrayals of Spencer Tracy and Loretta Young, particularly Mr. Tracy's. Their work results in much of the narrative being quite interesting and several of the scenes are blessed with touches of originality." The film's box office performance was described as "dismal".

The film was a box office disappointment.

In 1998, Jonathan Rosenbaum of the Chicago Reader included the film in his unranked list of the best American films not included on the AFI Top 100.

The film was nominated for the American Film Institute's 2002 list AFI's 100 Years...100 Passions.

References

External links

 
 
 
 

1933 films
1933 romantic drama films
American black-and-white films
American romantic drama films
Columbia Pictures films
Films directed by Frank Borzage
Films with screenplays by Jo Swerling
1930s English-language films
1930s American films